A Journey in Other Worlds: A Romance of the Future is a science fiction novel by John Jacob Astor IV, published in 1894.

Overview

The book offers a fictional account of life in the year 2000. It contains abundant speculation about technological invention, including descriptions of a worldwide telephone network, solar power, air travel, space travel to the planets Saturn and Jupiter, and terraforming engineering projects — damming the Arctic Ocean, and an adjustment of the axial tilt of the Earth (Terra) by the Terrestrial Axis Straightening Company.

The future United States is a multi-continental superpower. European nations have been taken over by socialist governments, which have sold most of their African colonies to the U.S., while Canada, Mexico, and the countries of South America have requested annexation. Space travel is achieved through apergy, an anti-gravitational energy force. 

Jupiter proves to be a jungle world, with flesh-eating plants, vampire bats, giant snakes and mastodons, and flying lizards. The Americans discover a wealth of exploitable resources: iron, silver, gold, lead, copper, coal, and oil.

Saturn, in contrast, is an ancient world of silent spirits. These beings provide the explorers with foresight of their own deaths. One of the spirits, a deceased bishop, tells the voyagers about the icy world Cassandra, which orbits the Sun beyond Neptune and is home to the souls of unworthy Earthlings.

Other editions
A paperback edition of A Journey in Other Worlds was issued in 2003.

See also

 Across the Zodiac (1880) by Percy Greg
 Annals of the Twenty-Ninth Century (1874) by Andrew Blair
 The Great Romance (1881) by Anonymous
 Journey to Mars (1894) by Gustavus W. Pope
 Journey to Venus (1895) by Gustavus W. Pope
 A Prophetic Romance (1896) by John McCoy

References

External links
 
 

1894 American novels
1894 science fiction novels
American science fiction novels
Space exploration novels
Fiction set on Jupiter
Fiction set on Saturn
Fiction set in 2000
D. Appleton & Company books
Novels set in the future